North Toraja (or Toraja Utara) is a landlocked regency (kabupaten) of South Sulawesi Province of Indonesia, and the home of the Toraja ethnic group. The local government seat is in Rantepao which is also the center of Toraja culture. Formerly this regency was the northern part of Tana Toraja Regency, but on 24 June 2008 the northeastern 36% of the latter's area was split off to form a separate Regency. It covers an area of 1,151.47 km2 and had a population of 216,762 at the 2010 census and 261,086 at the 2020 census, comprising 133,335 males and 127,751 females; the official estimate as at mid 2021 was 264,145.

The Tana Toraja boundary was determined by the Dutch East Indies government in 1909. In 1926, Tana Toraja was under the administration of Bugis state, Luwu. The regentschap (or regency) status was given on 8 October 1946, the last regency given by the Dutch. Since 1984, Tana Toraja has been named as the second tourist destination after Bali by the Ministry of Tourism, Indonesia. Since then, hundreds of thousands of foreign visitors have visited this regency. In addition, numerous Western anthropologists have come to Tana Toraja to study the indigenous Torajan people and their culture.

[[Image:COLLECTIE TROPENMUSEUM 'Leden van de 'Toradjasche Christelijke Jongelieden Vereeniging 'Boenga Lalan voor de pastorie te Malaboh Toraja Sulawesi.' TMnr 10001356.jpg|thumb|right|375px|Christian mission in Tana Toraja Regency, Netherlands colonial period.picture credits : Tropenmuseum.]]

 Geography 

Tana Toraja is located on the Sulawesi island, 300 km north of Makassar, the provincial capital of South Sulawesi. Its geographical location is between latitude of 2°-3° South and longitude 119°-120° East. The area of the new North Toraja Regency is 1,151.47  km2, about 2.5% of the total area of South Sulawesi province. The topography of Tana Toraja is mountainous; its minimum elevation is 150 m, while the maximum is 3,083 above the sea level.

 Administrative Districts 
North Toraja Regency comprises twenty-one administrative Districts (Kecamatan), tabulated below with their areas and their populations at the 2010 census and the 2020 census, together with the official estimates as at mid 2021. The table also includes the locations of the district administrative centres, the number of administrative villages (111 rural desa - here called lembang - and 40 urban kelurahan) in each district, and its post codes.

Note: (a) except kelurahan'' of Tantepao, Manggalo and Pasale (which have post code of 91831), and Mentirotiku and Laang Tanduk (which have a post code of 91834).

See also 

 List of regencies and cities of Indonesia

References

External links 

Toraja Treasures.com - Toraja online information.
 

Regencies of South Sulawesi
Torajan people